The 1993–94 season was FC Dinamo București's 45th season in Divizia A. Dinamo started the season with a terrible loss against greatest rivals Steaua, on home soil and continued with poor results, ending the season with 11 losses.

The match against Progresul, in September, ended 1-1, but Dinamo was punished with a forfeit with a 3–0 loss due to threatening or abuse from the players or coaches against the referees.

In Europe, Dinamo was eliminated in the first round of the UEFA Cup.

The season ended in April to allow the national team to prepare the 1994 FIFA World Cup. After the season, the teams from Divizia A, without the national players, entered the newly-formed League Cup. Dinamo reached the regional final, but lost against Rapid who eventually beat UTA in the competition final.

Results

UEFA Cup 

First round

Cagliari won 4–3 on aggregate.

Squad 

Goalkeepers: Florin Prunea (28/0), Perlat Musta (2/0), Sorin Atanasescu (4/0), Stelian Bordeianu (1/0).

Defenders: Zoltan Kadar (31/5), Gheorghe Mihali (30/4), Leontin Grozavu (30/1), Marian Pană (28/1), George Visalom (8/0), Tudorel Cristea (3/0), Vasile Brătianu (3/0), Adrian Matei (2/0), Ionuț Voicu (0/0).

Midfielders: Florin Constantinovici (32/5), Costel Pană (30/8), Damian Militaru (25/6), Viorel Tănase (25/1), Cristian Sava (15/0), Marian Năstase (12/2), Marian Cobulianu (8/0), Marius Priseceanu (6/0), Sebastian Moga (4/0), Gabriel Răduță (2/0), Marius Coporan (2/0), Eugen Popistașu (1/0), Laurențiu Lică (0/0), Cătălin Hîldan (0/0).

Forwards: Sulejman Demollari (30/6), Viorel Moldovan (29/9), Cristian Pușcaș (27/4), Marian Savu (25/12).

Transfers 

Viorel Moldovan was bought from Gloria Bistrița, in exchange for Florin Tene. Marius Cheregi, Tibor Selymes, Ovidiu Hanganu and Dorinel Munteanu were all sold to Cercle Brugge K.S.V. Gábor Gerstenmájer moved to FC Luzern. Vasile Jercălău left for Selena Bacău. Daniel Timofte reached an agreement with Samsunspor. Nelson Mensah moved to Hapoel Tel Aviv.

References 
 www.labtof.ro
 www.romaniansoccer.ro
 Dinamo Bucuresti in 1993-94

FC Dinamo București seasons
Dinamo Bucuresti